Phlai Chumphon is a subdistrict in the Mueang Phitsanulok District of Phitsanulok Province, Thailand. In this subdistrict are Pibulsongkram Rajabhat University and CentralPlaza Phitsanulok shopping center.

Geography
The topography of Phlai Chumphon subdistrict is fertile lowlands. The subdistrict is bordered to the north by Chom Thong subdistrict, to the east by Ban Khlong subdistrict and Hua Ro subdistrict, to the south by Wat Chan subdistrict and Tha Thong subdistrict, and to the west by Ban Krang subdistrict. Phlai Chumphon subdistrict lies in the Nan Basin, which is part of the Chao Phraya Watershed. The Nan river flows east of the subdistrict. An irrigation canal (Huai Nong Khlong Bueng) flows from Chom Thong subdistrict, through Phlai Chumphon subdistrict to Ban Khlong subdistrict and is an important water source for agricultural consumption and also a raw water source to produce village water supply. The area to the west of this irrigation canal is for agriculture and the area to the east of this irrigation canal is for urbanization.

History
Originally, the subdistrict area was combined with Hua Ro subdistrict, called Wat Tan Chon subdistrict. It was separated into two subdistricts, with the Nan river as a dividing line. The area on the east side was called Hua Ro subdistrict and the area on the west side was called Phlai Chumphon subdistrict. On 30 March 1996 Phlai Chumphon Subdistrict Administrative Organization-SAO (ongkan borihan suan tambon) was established. Upgrade to subdistrict municipality (thesaban tambon) was on 30 June 2008.

Administration
The administration of Phlai Chumphon subdistrict municipality is responsible for an area that covers 13.7 km2 and consists of five administrative villages, as of 2019: 7,462 people and 4,021 households.

 

Administrative villages contain many villages such as:

Temples

Phlai Chumphon subdistrict is home to the following active temples, where Theravada Buddhism is practiced by local residents.

There is also a "samnak song", houses of monks that are not officially registered, called Samnak Song Phitsanulok Mueang Mai (Moo5).

Logo
The Phlai Chumphon subdistrict municipality logo shows a war elephant. Phlai Chumphon means: a herd of elephants.

Economy
Mฺost of the population west of the irrigation canal are engaged in agriculture, of which rice is the main crop.
Retail, hotels, restaurants and factories are mainly located along Singhawat road, highway 12 (Phitsanulok - Sukhothai route). CentralPlaza Phitsanulok (Moo5) plays a role in the employment service.

Infrastructure

Education

Higher education
Pibulsongkram Rajabhat University (Moo5)

Primary/secondary education
 Imperial Phitsanulok bilingual school.(Moo4)
 Ban Plai Chumpon school.(Moo4)

Child development center
 Ban Phlai Chumphon child development center.(Moo4)

Healthcare
There is Phlai Chumphon health-promoting hospital in Moo4.

Transportation

Roads
 Highway 12, Phitsanulok-Sukhothai route.
 National road 2011, Phitsanulok to the north.
 Other concrete or asphalt roads are unnamed.
 Side streets have their own name.

Electricity
All households in Phlai Chumphon subdistrict municipality have access to the electricity network.

Communications
All households in Phlai Chumphon subdistrict municipality have access to the fixed and mobile telephone network.
 TOT Public Company Ltd.(Moo3)

Waterworks
Provincial Waterworks Authority (PWA) is not cooperating to provide information on the number of households that have access to their water network in Phlai Chumphon subdistrict municipality.

Notes
 The website of the Phlai Chumphon subdistrict municipality has a Thai domain name containing Thai characters. The URL encoding used by ThaiURL is not working! This means that this website can't be visited outside Thailand.

References

Tambon of Phitsanulok province
Populated places in Phitsanulok province